Hunter Mountain or Hunters Mountain may refer to:

In New York
Hunter Mountain (New York), a mountain in Greene County
Hunter Mountain (ski area), on the above mountain
Hunter Mountain Fire Tower, on the above mountain
Southwest Hunter Mountain, a subpeak of the above mountain

Elsewhere
Hunter Mountain Shiobara, a ski area in Nasushiobara, Tochigi Prefecture, Japan
Hunter Mountains, a mountain range in New Zealand
Hunter's Mountain, Nova Scotia, a community in Canada